{{Infobox person
| name = Herbert "Bert" Pitman
| honorific_suffix = 
| image = Herbert Pitman.png
| caption =  Pitman in 1912, after the Titanic disaster
| occupation = Merchant Navy Officer
| birth_name = Herbert John Pitman
| birth_date = 
| birth_place = Sutton Montis, Somerset, England, United Kingdom
| death_date = 
| death_place = Pitcombe, Somerset, England, United Kingdom
| known_for = Third Officer of RMS Titanic
}}

Herbert John "Bert" Pitman MBE (20 November 1877 – 7 December 1961) was an English Merchant Navy seaman, who was the Third Officer of RMS Titanic when it sank in the North Atlantic Ocean with heavy loss of life after striking an iceberg during the night of 14 April 1912 on its maiden voyage.

Early life
Pitman was born in the Somerset village of Sutton Montis in England. He was the son of farmer Henry Pitman and Sarah (née Marchant) Pitman. After his father's death in 1880, his mother remarried, to Charles Candy. In 1881, a census shows Herbert Pitman was living on a  farm on Sutton Road with his brother, sister, and widowed mother.

Sea career
Pitman first went to sea in 1895 at the age of 18 after joining the Merchant Navy. He received the shore part of his nautical training in the Navigation Department of the Merchant Venturers' Technical College, under Mr. E. F. White, and qualified as a Master Mariner in August 1906. He served a four-year apprenticeship with James Nourse Ltd. followed by five years as a Deck Officer. From 1904, he served one year as a Deck Officer with the Blue Anchor Line before moving to the Shire Line, with whom he served for six months. He moved to the White Star Line in 1906. While employed with White Star, he served as Fourth, Third and Second Officer on the vessels Delphic and Majestic, and as Fourth Officer on the Oceanic. 

RMS Titanic
Like the other junior officers Pitman received a telegram early in 1912 directing him to report to White Star's Liverpool office at nine in the morning on 26 March of that year. There he collected his ticket for Belfast; he arrived there at noon the following day and reported to (then) Chief Officer William Murdoch. As the Titanic departed Southampton on 10 April, Pitman was assisting (now First) Officer Murdoch at the stern of the ship in supervising the casting-off of mooring ropes and taking on of tug lines. While the Titanic was at sea, Pitman's duties included working out celestial observation and compass deviation, general supervision of the decks, looking to the quartermasters, and relieving the bridge officers when necessary.

At the time of the Titanics collision with the iceberg, Pitman was off-duty, half-asleep in his bunk in the Officers' Quarters. He heard and felt the collision, later testifying that it felt like the ship "coming to an anchor." He was dressing for his watch when Fourth Officer Boxhall rushed in and informed him they had struck an iceberg and were taking on water. Pitman was then ordered to report to the starboard side of the ship to assist in uncovering lifeboats. After receiving the command to lower the boats, Murdoch ordered Pitman to take charge of Lifeboat No. 5. Before Pitman entered the lifeboat, Murdoch shook his hand saying "Goodbye; good luck." Pitman at this point did not believe that the Titanic was seriously endangered, and thought the evacuation of passengers was precautionary. He stepped into the lifeboat and it was lowered to the water. Murdoch had ordered Pitman to take the lightly loaded lifeboat to the gangway doors to take on more passengers there, but (as Pitman later testified) the doors failed to open as the lifeboat waited for this about 100 yards off from the ship.

Up to this point Pitman had expected the ship to remain afloat. After an hour in the lifeboat however, he realised that Titanic was doomed, and withdrew the lifeboat 300 yards further off from the descending ship. He watched Titanic sink from about 400 yards distance, and was one of the few to state afterwards in the official enquiries that he thought she sank in one piece. As the stern slipped under water, he looked at his watch and announced to the lifeboat's occupants, "It's 2.20,". Hearing the cries of those in the water after the ship had gone, Pitman decided to row back to them to rescue whomever he could. However, after announcing this course of action to the passengers in the lifeboat he was confronted with voluble protests from amongst them against the idea, with the expression of fear that the lifeboat would be mobbed and capsized by the panicking multitude in the water. Faced with this Pitman acquiesced and kept the lifeboat at its station several hundred yards off whilst the passengers and crew in the water perished swiftly in the cold. (In later life Pitman admitted to bearing the burden of a bad conscience for his failure to take the lifeboat to the rescue of those dying in the water that night).

Lifeboat No. 5 was picked up by the next morning by the rescue ship  along with the other survivors from the sinking, and Pitman arrived at Pier 54 in New York City with the rest of the survivors on 18 April 1912. While in New York he testified as a witness in the American Government's inquiry into the sinking. He and his fellow surviving officers left New York City on the Adriatic on 2 May 1912. On returning home to England, he testified as a witness to the sinking for a second time before a British Governmental inquiry.

Later years
Pitman continued to serve with the White Star Line following the Titanic disaster. He served on the liners  and Titanic''s older sister , later moving from deck officer to purser because of his failing eyesight. In the early 1920s, he moved from White Star to Shaw, Savill and Albion Company Ltd. and also took a wife in 1922 – Mildred "Mimi" Kalman from New Zealand. He spent his retirement living in the village of Pitcombe, in the county of Somerset, with his niece (his wife having preceded him in death).

Death
Pitman died of a subarachnoid hemorrhage on 7 December 1961 at the age of 84 years. His body was buried in the graveyard of Pitcombe Parish Church, Somerset.

Media
 In the 1997 Titanic film, Pitman was portrayed by film producer Kevin De La Noy.

References

Pitman's testimony on Day 4 of the US Senate Inquiry

Further reading
Mr Herbert John Pitman article at Encyclopedia Titanica. Accessed 12 December 2014
Third Officer Herbert John Pitman of the Titanic at Titanic-Titanic.com. Accessed 12 December 2014

1877 births
1961 deaths
RMS Titanic's crew and passengers
British Merchant Navy officers
People from Somerset
RMS Titanic survivors